Daniil Igorevich Gorovykh (born 3 January 1997) is a Russian football player. He plays for FC Tekstilshchik Ivanovo.

Club career
He made his debut in the Russian Football National League for FC Volgar Astrakhan on 8 May 2021 in a game against FC Akron Tolyatti.

References

External links
 Profile by Russian Football National League
 

1997 births
Sportspeople from Krasnodar
Living people
Russian footballers
Association football defenders
FC Spartak Moscow players
FC Veles Moscow players
FC Leningradets Leningrad Oblast players
FC SKA Rostov-on-Don players
FC Saturn Ramenskoye players
FC Volgar Astrakhan players
FC Tom Tomsk players
FC Urozhay Krasnodar players
FC Tekstilshchik Ivanovo players
Russian First League players
Russian Second League players